Cabarita ferry wharf is located on the southern side of the Parramatta River serving the Sydney suburb of Cabarita. It served by Sydney Ferries Parramatta River services operating between Circular Quay and Parramatta. The single wharf is served by RiverCat class ferries. The wharf was opened on 20 January 2000 in conjunction with improved transport services to Homebush Bay for the Sydney 2000 Olympic Games.

Wharves & services

Interchanges
Transit Systems operates two bus route to and from Cabarita wharf:
466: to Burwood station
502: to Drummoyne and the City via Concord and Five Dock

References

External links

Cabarita Wharf at Transport for New South Wales (Archived 11 June 2019)
Cabarita Local Area Map Transport for NSW

Ferry wharves in Sydney